Bjorn Alberic Basson (born 11 February 1987) is a South African professional rugby union player playing as a wing or full-back for the San Diego Legion of Major League Rugby (MLR).

He previously played for Enisei-STM in the European Rugby Challenge Cup.

Professional career

Griquas and Cheetahs

After playing for the  side in 2005 and 2006, he then moved to Kimberley to join . He made his debut in the 2008 Vodacom Cup competition, starting the match against former side  in East London and scoring a try to help Griquas to a 15–5 win. He played in eight matches, scoring five tries. His first-ever Currie Cup season in 2008 saw him score a further six tries in eleven matches.

2010 was Basson's most prolific season of all.

He then broke the record for the most number of tries scored in a single Currie Cup season, scoring no less than 21 for Griquas in the 2010 Currie Cup Premier Division.

Bulls

Basson signed a two-year contract with the Blue Bulls Company on 19 September 2010. He later extended his contract, signing on until October 2016.

Stormers

Oyonnax

Basson joined French Top 14 side  in December 2017, signing as a medical joker for the injured Matt Hopper.

Southern Kings

Basson returned to South Africa in 2018 to join the  ahead of the 2018–19 Pro14.

National team

Emerging Springboks 

In 2008, Basson was chosen to represent the Emerging Springboks team, which went on to win the 2008 IRB Nations Cup in Romania.

During the 2009 British & Irish Lions tour to South Africa, he twice played against the Lions; once for the Royal XV and again for the Emerging Springboks.

South African national team 

Basson was selected for the Springboks tour of the United Kingdom and Ireland in 2010. He made his test debut on 5 June 2010 against Wales in Cardiff.

On 15 November 2010 he and Chiliboy Ralepelle were suspended and sent home from the Northern Hemisphere tour after testing positive for a banned substance after the game against Ireland on 6 November 2010. Both players tested positive for methylhexaneamine, a "non-specified stimulant" on the prohibited substances list of WADA.

Basson played in two tests during the 2012 mid-year series for the Springboks: their 36–27 win over England and their 14–14 draw with England.

Honours
 2010 – Award: Absa Currie Cup Premier Division Player of the Year

References

External links
 
 From thebulls.co.za
 From sabcnews.co.za
 itsrugby.co.uk profile

Living people
1987 births
South African rugby union players
South Africa international rugby union players
Sportspeople from Qonce
Bulls (rugby union) players
Blue Bulls players
Cheetahs (rugby union) players
Griquas (rugby union) players
Rugby union wings
Mie Honda Heat players
South African expatriate rugby union players
South African expatriate sportspeople in Japan
Expatriate rugby union players in Japan
Southern Kings players
Stormers players
Western Province (rugby union) players
Oyonnax Rugby players
Yenisey-STM Krasnoyarsk players
San Diego Legion players
Rugby union players from the Eastern Cape